Goodnight Mister Tom is a 1998 film adaptation by Carlton Television of the novel of the same name by Michelle Magorian. The film was directed by Jack Gold, in his final film. The cast featured well-known British actors, including veteran actor John Thaw.

Plot
In September 1939, the United Kingdom declares war on Nazi Germany, and children are evacuated from London to the countryside for their safety. Tom Oakley, a lonely and bitter old man living in the countryside village of Little Weirwold, is forced to look after one of the evacuees, William "Willie" Beech. Tom has long since withdrawn from life after losing his wife and child to scarlet fever many years before, while Willie is a quiet young boy who comes from an abusive home and is apprehensive of Tom.

Despite initial difficulties combined with his reluctance to care for Willie, Tom later takes pity on Willie after learning about his abusive upbringing by discovering the leather belt his mother used to beat him, and does his best to create a suitable home for Willie, such as providing him with new clothes and helping to educate him. Willie's new life with Tom eventually boosts his self-confidence and he opens up to Tom, looking up to him as a surrogate father figure. He also meets and becomes best friends with a Jewish boy, Zacharias "Zach" Wrench. However, shortly after Willie's tenth birthday, Tom receives a letter from Mrs. Beech, who claims to be ill and needs Willie back in London to look after her.

When Willie reunites with his mother, he discovers that she lied to get him to return and is completely fine. Willie also meets his baby half-sister, Trudy. Mrs. Beech claims she is a "present from Jesus", and Willie is too young and naïve to consider any other scenario. It is obvious, however, that Mrs. Beech has been made much more uneasy by the Blitz, and after an argument sparked by her discovery of the absence of the belt (which Willie discarded), Mrs. Beech sends Willie to his room for the night. The next day, Mrs. Beech seems better after suffering a mental breakdown, but when Willie presents her with gifts that the locals from Little Weirwold had given him, and tells her about some of his friends, she accuses him of stealing and is angry he had been  interacting with girls and Jews. She finally pummels him and eventually locks him in the cupboard under the stairs after he tells her that Jesus was a Jew. Back in Little Weirwold, Tom starts missing Willie greatly. Initially he thinks Willie has moved on from him, until he finds the belt he threw away a few days earlier. Tom has an instinct that Willie is in danger, so he travels to London with his dog Sammy.

After spending the night in an air raid shelter, Tom enlists the help of an A.R.P. Warden, Ralph, to find Willie's address. They are informed by a neighbour, unaware that Willie has returned from evacuation, that Mrs. Beech has left. Sammy detects a strange smell from the house and Tom breaks the door down. Sammy leads Tom and Ralph to the cupboard under the stairs, which appears to be the source of a vile stench. They find Willie bloodied and battered, but still alive, and chained to the closet wall. He is also holding Trudy, who has died. Tom visits Willie in the hospital and meets Dr. Stelton, a child psychiatrist who works with a children's home in Sussex. Stelton wishes to take Willie to the children's home as he believes he needs psychiatric treatment, although he promises to attempt to trace any surviving relatives that Willie might have. It is during a discussion with Ralph that Tom learns about Willie's early childhood; Willie's father was a violent wife-beating alcoholic who choked to death on his own vomit. Tom decides that it would be best for Willie to return to Little Weirwold and kidnaps him from the hospital.

Willie gradually recovers from his injuries and reunites with Zach and the others. While speaking with Zach, Willie learns about the concept of sex, something his mother raised him to believe was "something dirty" and unacceptable, and realises that his mother herself had been having a relationship with another man, which resulted in the birth of Trudy. Eventually, Stelton and some social workers come to Tom's house with the news that Willie's mother is dead, having committed suicide. They intend to take Willie to the children's home, but Willie and Tom protest. Tom explains a bad dream that Willie has repeatedly been having regarding this exact event, and argues that he needs to be with someone who loves him.

Tom speaks alone with an official from the Home Office, Mr. Greenway, and persuades him that the only reason he wants Willie back is because he loves him like his own son and that Willie has clearly been happier with him than he ever was when he lived with his mother. Mr. Greenway accepts Tom's story and allows him to adopt Willie. Unfortunately, Willie's newfound happiness is cut short when Zach receives a phone call from his mother, saying that London's East End was bombed while his father was there, and he wants to see Zach one last time in case he dies. Zach is then killed in another air raid, and the news devastates Willie, causing him to withdraw from life. Tom, however, remembers how he felt when he lost his own family, and in an attempt to stop Willie going down the same path he did, gives Willie a heartfelt speech that while a loved one may physically be gone, they will always live on inside someone else's heart.

Willie eventually overcomes his grief and teaches himself how to ride the bicycle Zach left behind. In the film's final scene, Willie rides the bicycle down the long hill and stops just in front of an impressed Tom, whom he addresses as "Dad" for the first time.

Cast
 John Thaw as Tom Oakley 
 Nick Robinson as William Beech 
 Annabelle Apsion as Mrs Beech 
 Thomas Orange as Zacharias Wrench 
 William Armstrong as Dr Stelton 
 Geoffrey Beevers as Vicar 
 Mossie Smith as Mrs Fletcher 
 Peter England as Michael Fletcher 
 Ivan Berry as George Fletcher 
 Harry Capehorn as Edward Fletcher 
 Merelina Kendall as Mrs Holland 
 Marlene Sidaway as Mrs Webster 
 John Cater as Dr Little 
 Denyse Alexander as Mrs Little 
 Avril Elgar as Mrs Ford
 Pauline Turner as Annie Hartridge

Awards
 National Television Awards 1999: Best Drama for Goodnight Mister Tom
 BAFTA 1999: Lew Grade Award for Most Popular Television Programme of 1998 for Goodnight Mister Tom
 Television & Radio Industries Club Award 1999: Best ITV/Channel 5 Programme of 1998 for Goodnight Mister Tom

References

External links
 

British television films
Carlton Television
Television series by ITV Studios
British World War II films
1998 films
Films based on British novels
Films based on children's books
Films directed by Jack Gold
Films scored by Carl Davis
Films set in 1939
Films set in the United Kingdom
1990s British films